Hathras district (previously called Mahamaya Nagar district) is a district of Uttar Pradesh state of India. The city of Hathras is the district headquarters. Hathras district is a part of Aligarh division.

History 
Hathras district was created on 3 May 1997 by incorporating parts of the Aligarh, Mathura, and Agra districts. It was originally named Mahamaya Nagar (named for Mayadevi, mother of the Buddha) and was renamed to Hathras district in 2012.

In 2020, a 19-year-old Dalit woman was gang-raped in the Hathras district, by four upper caste men. She died two weeks later in a Delhi hospital.

Divisions 
The district comprises four tehsils: Hathras, Sadabad, Sikandra Rao, and Sasni, which are further divided into seven blocks: Sasni, Hathras, Mursan, Sadabad, Sahpau, Hasanpur Baru, Sikandra Rao, and Hasayan.

There are three Vidhan Sabha constituencies in this district: Hathras, Sadabad, and Sikandra Rao. All of these are part of Hathras Lok Sabha constituency.

Demographics

According to the 2011 census, Hathras district has a population of 1,564,708, roughly equal to the nation of Gabon. This gives it a ranking of 319th in India (out of a total of 640). Its population growth rate over the decade 2001–2011 was 17.12%. Hathras has a sex ratio of 871 females for every 1,000 males, and a literacy rate of 60.2%. Scheduled Castes made up 24.77% of the population.

At the time of the 2011 Census of India, 98.16% of the population in the district spoke Hindi and 1.24% Urdu as their first language. The local language is Braj.

Transport 
Four railway stations serve Hathras: Hathras Junction railway station, Hathras Road railway station, Hathras City railway station, and Hathras Kila railway station.

Notable people 
 
 
 Birendra Singh Rana (MLA)
 Kaka Hathrasi (Poet)
 Ramveer Upadhyay (MLA)

See also

Chamarua
Mai

References 

 
Districts of Uttar Pradesh
1997 establishments in Uttar Pradesh